James Abercrombie (February 18, 1792 – July 2, 1861) was an American politician and slave owner, and a United States Representative from Alabama.

Biography
Abercrombie was born in Hancock County, Georgia on February 18, 1792, son of Charles and Edwina Dicey Malinda Booth Abercrombie. He moved to Alabama in the early 1810s and settled first in Monroe County, now called Dallas County, Alabama, and then in Montgomery County, Alabama. He married Evelina Elizabeth Ross, and they had four children, James, Sarah, Jane, and Clara.
He died on July 2, 1861.

Career
During the War of 1812, Abercrombie served as a corporal in Maj. F. Freeman's Squadron of Georgia Cavalry. He studied law, and served as a member of the Alabama House of Representatives from 1820 to 1822, 1824 to 1825, and 1838 to 1839. He was also a member of the Alabama Senate from 1825 to 1833 and 1847 to 1850.

After having moved to Russell County, Alabama, in 1834, Abercrombie was elected from the Whig party to the United States House of Representatives from Alabama's 2nd congressional district. He served in that capacity from March 4, 1851, to March 3, 1855.

In 1859 Abercrombie moved to Florida and became engaged in supplying bricks for the government.

James Abercrombie was a slaveowner.

Death
Abercrombie died in Pensacola, Florida on July 2, 1861 (age 69 years, 134 days), and is interred at Linwood Cemetery in Columbus, Georgia.

References

External links
Biographical Directory of the United States Congress, 1774-1989: Bicentennial Edition. United States: Government Printing Office, 1989. 

Who Was Who in America, Historical Volume, 1607-1896. Chicago: Quincy Who's Who, 1963.
 

1792 births
1861 deaths
People from Hancock County, Georgia
Whig Party members of the United States House of Representatives from Alabama
Members of the Alabama House of Representatives
Alabama state senators
American slave owners
People from Monroe County, Alabama
People from Dallas County, Alabama
People from Montgomery County, Alabama
People from Pensacola, Florida
United States Army personnel of the War of 1812
People from Georgia (U.S. state) in the War of 1812